The Al Sulayyil ballistic missile base is a Saudi ballistic missile facility near the town of Al-Sulayyil, 450 km southwest of the Saudi Arabian capital, Riyadh.
 Constructed between 1987-1988, it is the first missile base of the Kingdom.

Location and layout
Al-Sulayyil RSSMF base was built in low mountain terrain at coordinates: .  The base houses two missile garrisons (a north and a south), with a third area providing housing, maintenance, and administrative functions. The garrisons themselves are located a short distance apart within a secured complex. The administrative and support complexes are outside the security perimeter to the south.  The missile garrisons have parking slots for mobile launchers and two large launch pads that are identical to ones that can be seen at Chinese DF-3 (CSS-2) Dongfeng missile bases.
The liquid-fueled DF-3A is an early Chinese nuclear intermediate-range ballistic missile bought by Saudi Arabia in 1987 and is believed to have a range of 4,000 - 5,000 km, with a 2,000 kg warhead.

See also 
 List of military installations in Saudi Arabia

References

Military installations of Saudi Arabia
